Richland Township, Illinois may refer to one of the following townships:

 Richland Township, LaSalle County, Illinois
 Richland Township, Marshall County, Illinois
 Richland Township, Shelby County, Illinois

Until 1850, Cortland Township, DeKalb County, Illinois was called Richland Township.

See also

Richland Township (disambiguation)

Illinois township disambiguation pages